Nita A. Farahany is an author and distinguished professor and scholar on the ramifications of new technology on society, law, and ethics. She is the author of the critically acclaimed book, The Battle for Your Brain: Defending the Right to Think Freely in the Age of Neurotechnology. She currently teaches Law and philosophy at Duke University where she is the Robinson O. Everett Distinguished Professor of Law & Philosophy at Duke Law School, the founding director of the Duke Initiative for Science and Society as well as a chair of the Bioethics and Science Policy MA program. She is active on many committees, councils, and other groups within the law, emerging technology, and bioethics communities with a focus on technologies that have increasing potential to have ethical and legal issues. In 2010 she was appointed by President Obama to the Presidential Commission for the Study of Bioethical Issues.

Education and background
Farahany completed her undergraduate studies at Dartmouth College where she earned a Bachelor of Arts (A.B.) in genetics, cell and developmental biology. Farahany continued with her education at Duke University in Durham, North Carolina, where she acquired a JD, MA, and PhD in philosophy of biology and jurisprudence.  Additionally, she attended Harvard to study biology and receive her Master of Arts in Liberal Studies (ALM) in the field. She has since moved on to teach as well as provide legal and ethical counsel to many.

Farahany also clerked for Judge Judith W. Rogers of the US Court of Appeals for the D.C. Circuit.

Work as an educator

Vanderbilt
Farahany began her work at Vanderbilt University to complete her dissertation. However, in 2006, she continued working at Vanderbilt as an assistant professor of law. She left in 2011 to become the Leah Kaplan Visiting Professor of Human Rights at Stanford Law.

Duke Law School
Farahany is a tenured Professor at Duke Law School, where she holds a Distinguished Chair as the Robinson O. Everett Professor of Law and Philosophy.

The Duke Initiative for Science and Society
Farahany is currently the Robinson O. Everett Distinguished Professor of Law and Philosophy at Duke University. Additionally, she is the founding director of the Duke initiative for Science and Society and the chair of the Bioethics and Science Policy MA.

Bioethics and Science Policy Master's Program
The Bioethics and Science Policy program is a program designed to merge bioethics training and policy and law training to add a new depth to education in these areas. It is the first of its kind. Questions concerning technological advancements affecting ethics surrounding biological science and neuroscience, and emerging technology such as artificial intelligence, machine learning, data sciences, social media, and the Internet are discussed heavily in this program, as well as preparing graduate students to be able to communicate science more efficiently with society.

SLAPLAB
SLAPLAB is the Duke Initiative for Science and Society laboratory designed to bring scholars in undergraduate studies all the way up to postdocs and faculty together. Here, directed by Farahany, they discuss new studies in ethics at the intersection of science, society, law, and philosophy. Additionally, the lab designs and undertakes new studies, present about current ongoing studies and new research, communicate with the public, and host expert speakers.

Ongoing Research projects and requirements for members can be found on the SLAPLAB website.

Presidential Appointments
In 2010, Nita A. Farahany was appointed by President Obama to serve on the Presidential Commission for the Study of Bioethical Issues. This commission was created on November 24, 2009 by president Obama to advise him on ethical, legal, social and philosophical issues in the biosciences.

Other notable work

Professional societies and councils 

International Neuroethics Society, or INS - Farahany has been a board member of the INS since 2012. She is the current president of the INS. 
Neuroethics Division of the Multi-Council Working group for BRAIN initiative
President's Research Council of Canadian Institute for Advanced Research, or CIFAR
Expert Network for World Economic Forum
Presidential Commission for the Study of Bioethical Issues
Elected Member of the American Law Institute
Elected Fellow of AAAS for "distinguished contributions to the field of neuroethics, enabling responsible and equitable development and implementation of new knowledge and technologies in neuroscience."
Serves on several corporations' Scientific and Ethics Advisory Boards

Presentations of work
Conferences for the US Court of Appeals
Conference for the National Judicial College
The American Association for the Advancement of Science
National Academies of Science Workshops
The American Society for Political and Legal Philosophy
Aspen Ideas Festival
The World Economic Forum
TED
Testifying before US Congress- during the hearing on “What Facial Recognition Technology Means for Privacy and Civil Liberties”.  Presented to the Senate Committee on the Judiciary Subcommittee on Privacy, Technology and the Law

TED talk

In November, 2018, Farahany gave a TED talk on the potential impact neurotechnology  (decoding human thoughts) could have on societies around the world. She delved into the potential ethical obligations we, as a global society, must agree upon and how we might be able to codify and enforce said ethical decisions. Farahany poses the question: what value should be placed on the thoughts in our head and what rights should humans have to be able to decide when, if ever, those thoughts are shared. The implications behind technology that can read thoughts are already being realized in China where some workers are required to wear EEG machines under their hats in order to collect information on that worker's productivity, focus, and mood. Farahany stated her concern that society is not adapting as quickly as technology, opining "I think this is because people don't yet understand or believe the implications of this new brain-decoding technology. " To protect ourselves from advancing neurotechnology, Farahany suggests a right to cognitive liberty be recognized as a part of the Universal Declaration of Human Rights.

Honors & Awards 

In 2021, she was awarded the Distinguished Teaching Award. Her students noted her "extraordinary vulnerability and her deep commitment to making all of her students feel like human beings," and the fact that “She opens every class asking about our lives, celebrating achievements, engagements, and cute pets. She shares details of her life with us to bring a smile to our faces and help us not feel so alone.” Farahany called the award the "most humbling honor of [her] professional career."

In 2020, Farahany earned the lifetime distinction of becoming a Fellow of the American Association for the Advancement of Science for "distinguished contributions to the field of neuroethics, enabling responsible and equitable development and implementation of new knowledge and technologies in neuroscience."

In 2013, she was elected as a member of the American Law Institute. That same year, she awarded the Paul M. Bator Award, which recognizes a young academic – under the age of forty – who has demonstrated excellence in legal scholarship, a commitment to teaching, a concern for students, and who has made a significant public impact.

References

External links 

 Staff profile at Duke University

Duke University faculty
Duke University School of Law alumni
Vanderbilt University faculty
Dartmouth College alumni
Harvard University alumni
American people of Iranian descent
American lawyers
Bioethicists
1978 births
Living people
Scientific American people